These are lists of singers.

By nationality

List of Afghan singers
List of African singers
List of Albanian singers
List of Algerian singers
List of Algolan singers
List of American singers
List of Andorran singers
List of Argentinian singers
List of Armenian singers
List of Australian singers
List of Austrians singers
List of Azerbaijani singers
List of Bahamian singers
List of Bangladeshi singers
List of Belarusian singers
List of Belgian singers
List of Bosniak singers
List of Brazilian singers
List of British singers
List of Bulgarian singers
List of Burundian singers
List of Cambodian singers
List of Cameroonian singers
List of Canadian singers
List of Colombian singers
List of Croatian singers
List of Cyprus singers
List of Czech singers
List of Danish singers
List of Democratic Republic of the Congo singers
List of Dutch singers
List of Ecuadorian singers
List of Estonian singers
List of Egyptian singers
List of Finnish singers
List of French singers
List of Georgian singers
List of German singers
List of Ghanaian singers
List of Greek singers
List of Hungarian singers
List of Icelandic singers
List of Indian singers
List of Indonesian singers
List of Iranian singers
List of Irish singers
List of Israeli singers
List of Italian singers
List of Jamaican singers
List of Japanese singers
List of Kenyan singers
List of Korean singers
List of Latvian singers
List of Lithuanian singers
List of Luxembourgish singers
List of Macedonian singers
List of Malaysian singers
List of Maltese singers
List of Mexican singers
List of Moldovan singers
List of Montenegrin singers
List of Nepalese singers
List of New Zealand singers
List of Nigerian singers
List of Norwegian singers
List of Pakistani singers
List of Philippines singers
List of Polish singers
List of Portuguese singers
List of Romanian singers
List of Russian singers
List of Serbian singers
List of Singaporean singers
List of Slovak singers
List of Slovenian singers
List of Sri Lankan singers
List of Spanish singers
List of Sudanese singers
List of Swedish singers
List of Swiss singers
List of Taiwanese singers
List of Tajikistani singers
List of Turkish singers
List of Ugandan singers
List of Ukrainian singers
List of Uruguayan singers
List of Uzbek singers
List of Vietnamese singers
List of Welsh singers
List of Zambian singers
List of Zimbabwean singers

By genre 
List of baritones in non-classical music
List of Carnatic singers
List of Christian vocal artists
List of contraltos in non-classical music
List of crooners
List of female heavy metal singers
List of jazz singers
List of mezzo-sopranos in non-classical music
List of operatic contraltos
List of operatic pop artists
List of female rock singers
List of scat singers
List of sopranos in non-classical music
List of Sufi singers
List of tango singers
List of tenors in non-classical music

By nationality and genre 
List of American female country singers
List of Brazilian singers and bands of Christian music
List of Danish operatic sopranos
List of Finnish operatic sopranos
List of Norwegian operatic sopranos
List of Swedish operatic sopranos
List of traditional Irish singers
List of Pakistani pop singers
List of Russian opera singers
List of Ukrainian opera singers

By language or region 

List of Afrikaans singers
List of Geordie singers
List of Pashto-language singers
List of Punjabi singers
List of Sindhi singers
List of Agari singers

Other
List of African-American singers
List of Broadway musicals stars
List of lead vocalists
List of singer-songwriters

See also
Lists of composers
Lists of musicians
Lists of women in music